Elachista irrorata is a moth of the family Elachistidae. It is found in North America, where it has been recorded from Illinois, Indiana, Maine, New Jersey, New York, Ohio, Ontario, Pennsylvania, Tennessee, Virginia and West Virginia.

The wingspan is 8.2–11 mm. The forewings are dark grey, densely speckled with black. The hindwings are gray, densely irrorated (speckled) with black. Adults have been recorded on wing from March to October.

The larvae feed on Glyceria striata and Agrostis perennans. They mine the leaves of their host plant. The mine is narrow and pale yellowish green in color. It starts low down on the leaf sheath and extends towards the tip of the leaf. Young larvae are yellow, becoming glaucous (pale green with a bluish-grey tinge) when full grown. The larvae can be found in April and May.

References

irrorata
Moths described in 1920
Moths of North America